U-43 class submarine may refer to:

 , a class of two former German Type UB II coastal submarines sold to the Austro-Hungarian Navy during World War I
 , a class of eight ocean-going submarines built at the Imperial Dockyard at Danzig during World War I